is a Japanese literary award conducted by Hayakawa Publishing Corporation. This contest prizes unpublished science fiction works to recruit new writers of the genre.

It was renamed for the second contest and held 18 times until 1992. Past debutants include Sakyō Komatsu, Ryu Mitsuse, Yasutaka Tsutsui, and Chōhei Kambayashi.

It resumed as a novel/novella contest in 2013, removing the interpunct from the name  and the number was reset to one.

References 

Japanese science fiction
Japanese science fiction awards
Japanese-language literary awards
Short story awards